Sir Charles Henry Darling  (19 February 1809 – 25 January 1870) was a British colonial governor.

Biography
He was born at Annapolis Royal, Nova Scotia, the son of Major-General Henry Darling and nephew of General Sir Ralph Darling.

He was educated at the Royal Military College, Sandhurst, and served in the garrisons of Barbados, the Windward Islands, and Jamaica, with the 57th Foot. He went to New South Wales in 1827 with this regiment, and served as assistant private secretary to the Governor of New South Wales, to his uncle Ralph Darling. He served in the British West Indies from 1833 until he retired from the army in 1841 and settled in Jamaica.

He started his colonial service while in Jamaica, during which time he often clashed with leaders of the free people of color who were elected to the island's Assembly, such as Robert Osborn (Jamaica). He became Lieutenant-Governor of St. Lucia in 1847, and he became Lieutenant-Governor of the Cape Colony in South Africa in 1851. A town in South Africa, on the West Coast of the country was named after Darling. He became Governor of Newfoundland in 1855.

Darling supported the British suggestions granting the French more fishing rights in waters of Newfoundland between Cape St. John and Cape Ray to the total disagreement of the Newfoundland government which ultimately led to the end of his term in office.

Darling became governor and captain-chief of Jamaica in 1857 then governor of Victoria, Australia from 1863 to 1866.

His first marriage was on 2 May 1835 to Anne Wilhelmina Dalzell (18 July 1813 – 16 October 1837). They had a son who died in infancy. Anne came from a wealthy family, who owned a plantation in Barbados. Through Anne's will, Darling would have received some money, although she died before her mother who had owned the slaves.

He was then married, at Christ Church, Barbados, on 14 December 1839 to Mary Ann Nurse (who died of yellow fever in St Lucia on 6 November 1848). His third marriage, at Ilfracombe, North Devon, was on 10 December 1851 to Elizabeth Isabella Caroline Salter ( 1820  – 10 December 1900).

Charles Henry Darling died at Lansdown Crescent, Cheltenham, Gloucestershire, aged 60.

Legacy
Darling Street in the Ballarat south suburb of Redan is named for him.

See also
 Governors of Newfoundland
 List of people of Newfoundland and Labrador
 Governor of Victoria

References

External links
Biography at Government House The Governorship of Newfoundland and Labrador
Biography at the Dictionary of Canadian Biography Online
Biography at Saint Lucia Government House

1809 births
1870 deaths
Graduates of the Royal Military College, Sandhurst
57th Regiment of Foot officers
Governors of Barbados
Governors of Newfoundland Colony
Governors of Victoria (Australia)
Governors of Jamaica
Knights Commander of the Order of the Bath
Colony of Victoria people
Governors of the Cape Colony
Governors of British Saint Lucia
19th-century Australian politicians